is one of the largest sogo shosha (general trading companies) in Japan; it is part of the Mitsui Group.

History 

The company was established in 1876 with 16 members including the founder, Takashi Masuda. As Japan's international trading was dominated by foreigners since the end of the Edo period, it aimed to expand business owned by Japanese citizens. By the end of World War II, it became a dominant trading giant, but was dissolved by the order of GHQ.

The current Mitsui & Co. was established in 1947 as Daiichi Bussan Kaisha, Ltd. (First Bussan Corporation Ltd). In 1959, it merged with several other trading companies and changed its name to Mitsui & Co., Ltd.

During Japan's period of rapid postwar economic growth, the firm was a key player in several major natural resources projects. In 1971, it took a stake in an offshore gas field near Das Island in Abu Dhabi, which supplies liquefied natural gas to Japan on an exclusive basis; it invested in a major Western Australian LNG project in 1985 and in the Sakhalin II project in 1994.

Its subsidiary Mitsui Oil Exploration's MOEX Offshore had a 10% stake in the Deepwater Horizon well in the Gulf of Mexico through a subsidiary, and in May, 2011, MOEX agreed to pay US$1.07 billion to settle British Petroleum claims against it over the explosion and oil spill at the well. Some analysts had thought BP would realize a larger settlement from MOEX but there was also relief to have a first step toward resolving the multiple claims.

Berkshire Hathaway acquired over 5% of the stock in the company, along with four other Japanese trading houses, over the 12-month period ending in August 2020.

Business areas 
Mitsui engages in six major business areas:

 Energy: Upstream development and trading in oil and gas, the firm's's largest line of business, accounting for over half of its consolidated EBITDA and net earnings in the first half of fiscal year 2015. Mitsui has two major energy projects in the United States, at the Marcellus Shale in the Mid-Atlantic and the Eagle Ford Shale in Texas.
 Metals: Development and trading with a focus on iron ore and steel. This business  accounts for about a quarter of consolidated EBITDA and net earnings. In 2014 Mitsui acquired a stake in the Moatize coal mine and Nacala rail and port development in Mozambique from the Brazilian mining company Vale.
 Chemicals:  basic and performance chemicals including fertilizers, electronics materials and functional materials.
 Machinery and Infrastructure: Sells, finances and invests in large-scale plants, ships, aircraft, automobiles and other heavy machinery.
 Lifestyle: food, retail, healthcare, fashion, forestry and real estate. In 2014, CEO Masami Iijima identified this segment as an area of particular interest, particularly in relation to Mitsui's cooperation with Lippo Group in Indonesia.
 Information and Corporate Development:  information technology, finance and logistics.

Recent activities 

 Wastewater treatment service project, Mexico
 Sakhalin II LNG Project, Russia
 Photovoltaic Power Project, Catalonia, Spain
 Acquisition of Taiwan TV Shopping Company
 Brazil Biofuel Project with Petrobras
 Bald Hills Wind Farm Project, Victoria, Australia
 Umm Al Nar Power and Water Project, Abu Dhabi

References

External links 
 

 
Companies listed on the Tokyo Stock Exchange
Companies listed on the Osaka Exchange
Conglomerate companies based in Tokyo
Keiretsu
Mitsui
Trading companies based in Tokyo
Companies established in 1876
Japanese companies established in 1876